Zuzana Drdáková (born June 16, 1987) is a Slovak women's ice hockey player. Currently, she is a member of Narmanspor team in Erzurum, Turkey playing as defenseman.

Career

Club
Zuzana Drdáková was with HK Poprad in her country before she transferred to the Erzurum-based Narmanspor in Turkey to play in the Turkish Women's Ice Hockey League (TBHBL). Her team finished the 2015–16 season as the runners-up.

Honors

Club
Turkish Ice Hockey Women's League (TBHBL)
 Runners-up (1): 2015–16 with Narmanspor.

References

1987 births
Place of birth missing (living people)
Slovak women's ice hockey defencemen
HC Lev Poprad players
Narmanspor players
Slovak expatriate sportspeople in Turkey
Expatriate ice hockey players in Turkey
Living people
Slovak expatriate ice hockey people